Smiths Falls-Montague (Russ Beach) Airport  is a registered aerodrome located about  east of the town of Smiths Falls, Ontario, Canada.

The airport is operated by the Smiths Falls Flying Club, and is registered with Transport Canada. The Smiths Falls Flying Club operates a flight training unit with three Cessna 172 airplanes, and there is 100LL avgas available 24 hours via a self-serve credit card system. There are no landing, ramp or tie-down fees. Surface level aerobatics are frequently conducted over the paved runway 06/24.

Technical information

General
 Magnetic variation: 14° west

Runway
 Runway 06/24: , paved, lighted (ARCAL 122.9 MHz), abbreviated PAPI approach lighting at both ends

Communications
 UNICOM/ATF: Smiths Falls Unicom/Traffic, 122.7 MHz

See also
 List of airports in the Ottawa area

References

External links

 Official website

Registered aerodromes in Ontario
Buildings and structures in Lanark County